Saint-Martin-des-Champs is a commune in the Finistère department of Brittany in north-western France. Since 2014 the mayor has been François Hamon, who was reelected in 2020.

Population
Inhabitants of Saint-Martin-des-Champs are called in French Saint-Martinois.

Breton language
The municipality launched a language scheme for the Breton language through Ya d'ar brezhoneg on 27 October 2005.

See also
Communes of the Finistère department

References

External links

Official website 

Mayors of Finistère Association 

Communes of Finistère